The 1946–47 Cleveland Rebels season was the first and only season of the Cleveland Rebels of the Basketball Association of America (BAA/NBA). Their record was 30-30. Head coach Dutch Dehnert was fired by the team on February 12, 1947, and replaced by Roy Clifford.

Roster

Regular season

Season standings

Record vs. opponents

Game log

Playoffs

First round

(E3) New York Knicks vs. (W3) Cleveland Rebels: Knicks win series 2-1
Game 1 @ Cleveland (April 2): Cleveland 77, New York 51
Game 2 @ New York (April 5): New York 86, Cleveland 74
Game 3 @ New York (April 9): New York 93, Cleveland 71

Transactions

Trades

References

Cleveland
Cleveland Rebels seasons